Listen is the second studio album by English new wave band A Flock of Seagulls, released on 29 April 1983 by Jive Records. It once again teamed the group with record producer Mike Howlett—who produced their self-titled debut album—except on "(It's Not Me) Talking", which was produced by Bill Nelson. The album includes the UK top-10 single "Wishing (If I Had a Photograph of You)". Other singles released from the album include "Nightmares" and "Transfer Affection". The face on the cover is that of the band's drummer, Ali Score.

Reception
Listen received generally positive reviews. While Tom Demalon of AllMusic retrospectively felt the album was "sterile" and inconsistent, he found "Wishing (If I Had a Photograph of You)" to be "multilayered [and] hypnotic" while also praising "Nightmares" and "Transfer Affection".

Robert Christgau joked that the album's "aural pleasure" of "whooshes and zooms...and computerized ostinatos" could make Mr. Spock dance. He gave the album a B+ rating.

Reissues
Listen has been released with varying track listings on at least three separate occasions. The original 1983 release, the 1992 CD Beehive label release, 2004 Superfecta Recordings release and the 2010 Cherry Red release.

The cassette version and the 1992 CD version (on the Beehive label) contain the original LP tracks in a slightly different order, with the additional tracks "Rosenmontag", "Quicksand", and "The Last Flight of Yuri Gagarin" interspersed (although the track listing for the CD edition, printed on the inserts and the disc itself, incorrectly follows the LP track listing above rather than reflecting the disc's actual contents).

The 2004 CD version contains the 10 LP tracks in the order, followed by three bonus tracks—"Committed", "Quicksand", and a live rendition of "I Ran (So Far Away)". "(It's Not Me) Talking" was released in 1981, two years before Listen was released on Nelson's Cocteau label. The version of the song used on Listen is a re-recorded version; as a consequence, the Cocteau version has yet to see a CD release.

The 2010 Cherry Red release has the 10 LP tracks in the order, followed by the B-sides "Committed", "Quicksand" and "Tanglimara" and the remixes of "Wishing (If I Had a Photograph of You)" and "Nightmares".

Track listing

Original LP

Total length 1:12:05

Cassette 

This track listing was also used for the 1992 Beehive Trading Ltd. CD reissue.

Personnel

A Flock of Seagulls
 Mike Score – lead vocals, keyboards, guitar
 Paul Reynolds – lead guitar, backing vocals
 Frank Maudsley – bass guitar, backing vocals
 Ali Score – drums

Additional personnel
 Mike Howlett – producer (1-9)
 Bill Nelson – producer (10)
 Dave Hutchins – engineer, producer (A6)
 Conny Plank – producer (A6)
 Mike Score – producer (B7)
 Pete Watson – sleeve design, art direction
 Eric Watson – photography

Charts

Weekly charts

Year-end charts

Certifications

References

1983 albums
A Flock of Seagulls albums
Albums produced by Mike Howlett
Jive Records albums